Gao Lihua (born October 31, 1979, in Dalian, Liaoning) is a Chinese field hockey player who competed at the 2004 Summer Olympics, and won a silver medal in the 2008 Summer Olympics.

At the 2004 Olympic Games, she finished fourth with the Chinese team in the women's competition. She played all six matches and scored one goal.

External links
 
 Profile at Yahoo! Sports

1979 births
Living people
Chinese female field hockey players
Asian Games medalists in field hockey
Asian Games gold medalists for China
Field hockey players at the 2004 Summer Olympics
Field hockey players at the 2006 Asian Games
Field hockey players at the 2008 Summer Olympics
Field hockey players at the 2010 Asian Games
Field hockey players at the 2012 Summer Olympics
Medalists at the 2006 Asian Games
Medalists at the 2008 Summer Olympics
Medalists at the 2010 Asian Games
Olympic field hockey players of China
Olympic medalists in field hockey
Olympic silver medalists for China
Sportspeople from Dalian